The Papua New Guinea women's national rugby league team, also known as the PNG Orchids represents Papua New Guinea in Women's rugby league. They are administered by the Papua New Guinea Rugby Football League.

Current squad
Head coach: Ben Jeffries

Squad of 24 players for the World Cup. 
Table last updated 15 November 2022 following the Semi-Final match against Australia.

Notes: 
 The Other Matches tallies include matches against Australia, Far North Queensland, the Brisbane Broncos, and York Valkyrie.
 Elizabeth Kapa was selected for the postponed 2021 World Cup, but was unable to participate due to injury.
 The Orchids announced via social media on 26 October that Tara Moxon had been added to the squad.

Notable players

The following Papua New Guinea representatives have played in the NRL Women's Premiership 
 Elsie Albert (St. George Illawarra Dragons 2020present, 12 matches, 2 tries as at 5 September 2022)
 Therese Aiton (Parramatta Eels 2021 season, 2 matches)
 Amelia Kuk (Brisbane Broncos 2018, 2 matches)

Results

Full internationals

Other international matches 

Note: In all three of the above matches Papua New Guinea and Australia each fielded 20 players (13 on the field and 7 on the interchange bench).

Tour / Trial / Warm-Up Matches

Nines

See also

 Papua New Guinea national rugby league team
 Rugby league in Papua New Guinea
 Papua New Guinea Rugby Football League

References

External links

Papua New Guinea national rugby league team
Women's national rugby league teams